The 1992 African Championships in Athletics were held between 25 and 28 June 1992 in Belle Vue Maurel, Pamplemousses District, Mauritius at the Stade Anjalay.

Medal summary

Men's events

Women's events

Medal table

See also
1992 in athletics (track and field)

External links
Results – GBR Athletics

A
African Championships in Athletics
African Championships in Athletics
Afr
Pamplemousses District
International athletics competitions hosted by Mauritius